The Raymond–Summit Historic District is a historic district roughly encompassing the 400 blocks of North Raymond and North Summit Avenues in Pasadena, California. The residential historic district includes 22 contributing buildings. The area was part of Rancho San Pascual prior to its development.  In 1875, the Lake Vineyard Land and Water Company formed to manage the property. The company parceled out and sold the land and, between 1886 and 1904, the new owners built houses on their properties during a Pasadena building boom. Architectural styles represented among these homes include Queen Anne, Colonial Revival, American Foursquare, American Craftsman, Shingle Style, and a number of vernacular styles. Prominent Pasadena architects Greene & Greene designed a Shingle Style house at 450 North Raymond and two vernacular cottages at 442 and 448 North Summit; all three houses have Colonial Revival details.

The district was added to the National Register of Historic Places on August 9, 2011.

References

National Register of Historic Places in Pasadena, California
Buildings and structures on the National Register of Historic Places in Pasadena, California
Houses in Pasadena, California
Houses on the National Register of Historic Places in California
Historic districts on the National Register of Historic Places in California
Greene and Greene buildings